A constitutional referendum was held in Turkey on 9 July 1961. Following the coup d'état the previous year, a new constitution was drawn up to replace the one from 1924. It was approved by 61.7% of voters, with an 81.0% turnout.

Results

References

External links
Referendum Results
About 1961 Referendum

1961
1961 referendums
1961 in Turkey
1961 elections in Turkey